Facundo "Facu" Regalia (born 23 November 1991 in Buenos Aires) is an Argentine racing driver. He competed in his first two Formula BMW seasons under a Spanish racing licence.

Career

Karting
Regalia began karting in 2006 and raced primarily in Spain for the majority of his career.

Formula BMW
Regalia began his formula racing career in 2008 in the newly created Formula BMW Europe with EuroInternational. He finished sixteenth overall in the championship, with nine point-scoring finishes and 60 points.

Regalia remained in the series for the following season but switched to Josef Kaufmann Racing. He improved to eighth in standings, taking thirteen points-scoring positions in sixteen races. In 2010, Regalia completed his third season, joining Eifelland Racing. He finished eighth in the championship for the second successive season, achieving his first podium at Zandvoort.

Formula Three
2011 saw Regalia move to the Italian Formula Three Championship, competing for Arco Motorsport. He finished tenth in the championship with two podiums at Imola and Vallelunga. Also in 2011, he joined Mücke Motorsport to compete in Formula 3 Euro Series in the finale at Hockenheim. He had two finishes on the tenth position and retired in the last race of the week-end.

In 2012 Regalia switched to the European F3 Open Championship, joining Campos Racing.

Auto GP World Series
As well as his European F3 Open commitments, Regalia also participates in the Auto GP World Series with Campos Racing.

GP3 Series
Regalia made his GP3 Series debut, in the fourth round of the 2012 season at Silverstone. He replaced Jakub Klášterka at Jenzer Motorsport. In 2013, Regalia competed with ART Grand Prix with whom he finished runner-up to Daniil Kvyat.

GP2 Series
In 2014, Regalia graduated to GP2 with Hilmer Motorsport. After just four rounds where he failed to score a point, Regalia left the team and the series.

Formula 3.5
Regalia signed with Zeta Course for the 2015 season. However, the team withdrew from the sport due to lack of funding. Regalia attempted to enter the sport with Comtec Racing, but terminated his contract after three days with the team, leaving him without a drive.

Racing record

Career summary

† As Regalia was a guest driver, he was ineligible to score points.
‡ Position when the season was cancelled.

Complete Auto GP World Series results
(key) (Races in bold indicate pole position; races in italics indicate fastest lap)

‡ Position when season was cancelled.

Complete GP3 Series results
(key) (Races in bold indicate pole position) (Races in italics indicate fastest lap)

Complete GP2 Series results
(key) (Races in bold indicate pole position) (Races in italics indicate fastest lap)

References

External links
 

1991 births
Living people
Racing drivers from Buenos Aires
Formula BMW Europe drivers
Formula BMW Pacific drivers
Italian Formula Three Championship drivers
Formula 3 Euro Series drivers
Euroformula Open Championship drivers
Auto GP drivers
Argentine GP3 Series drivers
GP2 Series drivers
FIA Formula 3 European Championship drivers
Formula Regional European Championship drivers
Súper TC 2000 drivers
ART Grand Prix drivers
Van Amersfoort Racing drivers
Mücke Motorsport drivers
Josef Kaufmann Racing drivers
Campos Racing drivers
Jenzer Motorsport drivers
Hilmer Motorsport drivers
CRS Racing drivers
EuroInternational drivers
Eifelland Racing drivers
24H Series drivers